Dravinjski Vrh is a settlement on the right bank of the Dravinja River in the Municipality of Videm in eastern Slovenia. The area traditionally belonged to the Styria region. It is now included in the Drava Statistical Region.

The local church is dedicated to John the Baptist and was originally the chapel of Traun (Dranek) Castle. It dates to the 12th and 13th centuries and is a typical Romanesque church with a rectangular nave, a lower sanctuary, and a simple belfry next to its northern side. The foundations of Dranek Castle are barely visible. It was a castle built in the 12th century, mentioned in written sources dating to 1147 and was demolished by Ottoman raiders in 1532.

References

External links
Dravinjski Vrh on Geopedia

Populated places in the Municipality of Videm